Statistics of Second Division Football Tournament in the 2012 season. According to the FAM Calendar 2012, Second Division Football Tournament will start on 22 May.

Teams
10 teams are competing in the 2012 Second Division Football Tournament, and these teams were divided into 2 groups of 5.

Group stage round
From each group, the top two teams will be advanced for the league round.

Group 1
United Victory and BG Sports Club advanced to the league round as the top two teams of the group.

Group 2
Hurriyya SC and Sports Club Mecano advanced to the league round as the top two teams of the group.

League round
The top two teams from each group will be qualified to compete in this round. As a total of four teams will be playing in this round of the tournament, the top two teams from this round will be advanced to the Final. The top two teams of theis round will also play in the Playoff for 2013 Dhivehi League. United Victory and B.G. Sports Club claimed the first and second position to advance for the Final.

*Source:Haveeru Online

Final

Awards

References

External links
Huraa Beats JJ in first match at Haveeru Online (Dhivehi)

Maldivian Second Division Football Tournament seasons
Maldives
Maldives
2